Fevzi Pasha may refer to:

Ahmet Fevzi Big or Big Ahmed Fevzi Pasha (1871–1947), Ottoman general
Mustafa Fevzi Çakmak or Mustafa Fevzi Pasha (1876–1950), a Turkish field marshal and prime minister
Ahmed Fevzi Pasha (admiral) (fl. 1830s), a Kapudan Pasha (Ottoman admiral)
Kücük Ömer Fevzi Pasha, ruler of Crete 1868–1870 and 1871–1872